ITA Award for Best Actress Popular is an award given by the Indian Television Academy as a part of its annual event to the female actor who receives the highest votes.

First awarded in 2001, the award was originally named Desh Ki Dhadkan but was later renamed to Best Actress Popular.

Superlatives
As of 2019, Smriti Irani has won the award 5 times out of the 6 nominations she received from 2001 to 2006. Hina Khan and Surbhi Chandna have won 2 awards out of the 3 nominations they received. Sakshi Tanwar and Shweta Tiwari have 8 and 7 nominations, but have not won a single award. In 2004, Smriti Irani and Mona Singh, while in 2008 Parul Chauhan and Sara Khan shared the award.

Winners & nominees

2000s

2010s

2020s

See also
 ITA Award for Best Actor Popular
 ITA Award for Best Show Popular

References

External links
 Indian Television Academy Awards

Film awards for lead actress
Awards established in 2001
Actress